Acireductone dioxygenase (Ni2+-requiring) is an enzyme that catalyzes the chemical reaction

1,2-dihydroxy-5-(methylthio)pent-1-en-3-one + O2  3-(methylthio)propanoate + formate + CO

Thus, the two substrates of this enzyme are 1,2-dihydroxy-5-(methylthio)pent-1-en-3-one and oxygen, whereas its 3 products are 3-(methylthio)propanoate, formate, and carbon monoxide.

This enzyme belongs to the family of oxidoreductases, specifically those acting on single donors with O2 as oxidant and incorporation of two atoms of oxygen into the substrate (oxygenases). The oxygen incorporated need not be derived from O2.  The systematic name of this enzyme class is 1,2-dihydroxy-5-(methylthio)pent-1-en-3-one:oxygen oxidoreductase (formate- and CO-forming). Other names in common use include ARD, 2-hydroxy-3-keto-5-thiomethylpent-1-ene dioxygenase (ambiguous), acireductone dioxygenase (ambiguous), and E-2.  This enzyme participates in methionine metabolism.

References

 
 
 
 
 
 
 
 

EC 1.13.11
Enzymes of unknown structure